Beatty's Mills Factory Building, also known as Powell Mills, is a historic textile mill in the Kensington neighborhood of Philadelphia, Pennsylvania. It was built in 1886, and is a five-story, red brick building in the Italianate style. It was part of a complex of five buildings and is the only remaining structure. It is attached to a two-story school building built in 2002. The building housed textile-related manufacturing operations until 2000.  It houses the Coral Street Arts House.

It was added to the National Register of Historic Places in 2004.

References

External links
Coral Street Arts House website

Industrial buildings and structures on the National Register of Historic Places in Philadelphia
Italianate architecture in Pennsylvania
Industrial buildings completed in 1886
Kensington, Philadelphia
Textile mills in the United States